The 1985 Supercopa de España was a two-legged Spanish football match between Barcelona (winners of the league) and Atlético Madrid (cup winners); it was played on 9 October and 30 October 1985, with the latter team winning 3–2 on aggregate.

Match details

First leg

Second leg

References
 List of Super Cup Finals 1985 RSSSF.com
 linguasport.com

Supercopa de Espana Final
Supercopa de España
Supercopa de Espana 1985
Supercopa de Espana 1985